Le Jeudi was a French-language weekly newspaper published in Luxembourg.

History and profile
Le Jeudi was established in 1997. The paper is published in French language by Editpress.

Le Jeudi received €358,005 in annual state press subsidy in 2009.

The 2004 circulation of the paper was 6,500 copies.

Footnotes

External links
  Le Jeudi official website

1997 establishments in Luxembourg
Newspapers established in 1997
Weekly newspapers published in Luxembourg
French-language newspapers published in Luxembourg